Dave Petley is an earth scientist and vice chancellor at the University of Hull (appointed in 2022), in England. He was previously Vice President for Innovation at the University of Sheffield.

Education
Petley has a BSc in geography from King's College London (1990) and a PhD in Earth Sciences from University College London.

Career
He worked as a lecturer at the University of Sunderland and later at the University of Portsmouth. In 2000 he moved to the University of Durham where he established the Institute for Hazard, Risk and Resilience; in 2012 he became Dean of Research at Durham and also Dean of Global Engagement. Following a move to the University of East Anglia, he was appointed Pro-Vice-Chancellor for Research and Enterprise. In 2016 he was appointed to a similar role at the University of Sheffield; he became vice-president for Innovation at the same university in 2020.

Interests
Petley's major research interest is landslides, and in particular their mechanics, via both laboratory modelling and monitoring in the field. He has also worked extensively on the human and economic costs of landslides.

References

Year of birth missing (living people)
Living people
Alumni of King's College London
Alumni of University College London
British academics
Academics of the University of Hull
Academics of the University of Sheffield
Academics of the University of Sunderland
Academics of the University of East Anglia
Academics of Durham University
Academics of the University of Portsmouth